Vestborg Upper Secondary School is a Christian boarding school in the municipality of Stranda, in Møre og Romsdal county, Norway. The school is owned by the Norwegian Lutheran Mission. It offers general studies as well as supplementary studies qualifying for higher education for students who have previously attended vocational studies. The school accepts students from all over the country.

History 
The school started out as a mercantile school, named Storfjord handelsskole, January 9, 1949, before it changed names to Vestborg handelsskole in 1954. It was not until 1981 that the school became an upper secondary school, with its current name.

Headmasters 
 Knut Vikenes (1949-1962)
 Gunnar Skotte (1962-1986)
 Bernhard Belt (1986-1993)
 Svein Roar Grønbeck (1993-1998)
 Lars Birger Stige (1998-2005)
 Odd Rannestad (2005-2008)
 Geir Magne Engås (2008–present day)

External links
 http://vestborg.no/

Boarding schools in Norway
Secondary schools in Norway
Christian schools in Norway
High schools and secondary schools affiliated with the Lutheran Church
Private schools in Norway
Educational institutions established in 1949
1949 establishments in Norway
Education in Møre og Romsdal
Møre og Romsdal